Alder Escobar Forero (born 1977), is a Colombian chess player. He was awarded the title of Grandmaster by FIDE in 2014.

Career

Escobar Forero has represented Colombia in four Chess Olympiads; 2006, 2008, 2010 and 2012.
He played in the Chess World Cup 2019, where he was defeated by Leinier Domínguez in the first round.

In January 2018, Escobar Forero tied for third place with Praggnanandhaa and IM Denys Shmelov in the Charlotte Chess Center's Winter 2018 GM Norm Invitational held in Charlotte, North Carolina with a score of 5.0/9.

References

External links

Alder Escobar Forero chess games at 365Chess.com

1977 births
Living people
Chess grandmasters
Colombian chess players
20th-century Colombian people
21st-century Colombian people